, officially translated as The Frog For Whom the Bell Tolls, is an action role-playing video game developed by Nintendo and Intelligent Systems and published by Nintendo for the Game Boy exclusively in Japan in 1992.

The title is a play on Ernest Hemingway's For Whom the Bell Tolls (Japanese translation: 誰がために鐘は鳴る, Ta ga Tame ni Kane wa Naru), which is itself an allusion to John Donne's famous Meditation XVII. In 2011, an English fan translation was released.

Plot
In a land far away, the two princes—Richard (of the Custard Kingdom) and the game's main protagonist (prince of the Sablé Kingdom)—have shared a friendly rivalry since they were small children. They often compete, although it usually ends in a tie or close win. In Fencing however, Prince Richard is always the victor. One day a messenger arrives from a small neighboring kingdom, warning the princes that the evil King Delarin has invaded the Mille-Feuille Kingdom and captured the beautiful princess Tiramisu. In yet another boastful attempt to best the Sablé Prince, Richard grabs a boat and rushes towards the kingdom. The Sablé Prince is left trying to catch up.  While on his journey, he and Richard (along with others) are transformed into frogs in an attempt to reveal the true happenings in this kingdom.

Major characters
 The Prince of Sablé (sometimes referred to as Prince Sabure, Prince of Sabure, Prince Sablé, Sablé Prince, Prince Sable or Prince of Sable) - The main protagonist of the game (named at the beginning by the player). He is a good-natured and kindhearted boy, though he's not educated in the ways of world. He always loses against Prince Richard when they fence. Carefree in nature, they remain friends nonetheless. The kingdom of Sablé, being the wealthiest and most powerful nation in the land, has provided him with a comfortable life so far; he has never had to worry about money. This upbringing has had the side-effect of giving the Sablé Prince the idea that any problem can somehow be solved by tossing cash at it, which he does many times in the game. Through drinking two potions brewed by the witch Mandola, he gains the ability to transform into a frog and a snake and must use these transformations to progress.
 Prince Richard - He is the prince of the Custard Kingdom. The Sablé Prince is his good rival and childhood friend. During the course of the game, the Sablé Prince and Richard will both compete to save Princess Tiramisu first. Through strange events, he is transformed into a frog, along with his entire army.
 Princess Tiramisu - She rules the Mille-Feuille Kingdom. The legend of her unequaled beauty has spread far and wide through the land. Seeking her hand (forcibly) in marriage, King Delarin and his minions, the Croakians, have invaded the countryside and laid siege to the castle. The princess goes mysteriously missing.
 Jam - A thief from the town of A La Mode. He was hostile to the Sablé Prince at first, thinking he was a member of the Croakian Army. Their second meeting involved him stealing all of the Sablé Prince's money. Eventually the two realized the misunderstanding, and became friendly with each other. He wears an eyepatch and resembles a pirate. He is also transformed into a frog by Mandola.
 Mandola - A witch who wears glasses. She alone knows how to destroy King Delarin and restore the kingdom. She has an Aasvogel, a condor-like bird named Polnareff as a pet. She also knows how to brew magic potions.  At the end of the game, it is revealed that Mandola was actually the form Princess Tiramisu assumed in order to go into hiding.
 Lord Delarin - He is the title's antagonist.  He has captured Princess Tiramisu and released the Croakian army to wreak havoc within the Mille-Feuille Kingdom. It is later revealed that he is in fact a snake and plans to round up all the frogs in the kingdom for a feast.
 Mad Scienstein - (Dr. Ivan Knit in the fan translation) Works as a scientist at Nantendo Inc. He has a love for wasabi and creates multiple inventions to help Prince Sable, most notably the Ikari-Z, a rideable mech that may be called by playing the Z-Flute.

Gameplay
The Sablé Prince only gets stronger through the acquisition and use of items, thus placing the title as an "Action-Adventure" game, the same as the Legend of Zelda series.

The game's movement is divided into two ways:

 Bird's-Eye Scrolling - A top view that only is shown in villages, towns, fields and other similar areas. Like The Legend of Zelda franchise, moving up, down, left, and right on the D+Pad will move the Sablé Prince in that direction. Enemies are visible, and the player can begin battle by bumping into them. The majority of the game takes place in this style.
 2D-Platforming - A side view that is shown only in dungeons, caves, castles, and other similar places in the game, similar to Metroid, Kid Icarus and other side-scrolling platformers. The D+Pad moves the Sablé Prince left and right, while up is reserved climbing ladders and looking up. While looking up, Prince Sable can perform a super jump. As in the overhead view, enemies are visible in this perspective; the player can begin battle by bumping into them. Metroid and Metroid II: Return of Samus were the only previous games of Makoto Kanoh, this game's producer.

Enemy battles
When players make the Sablé Prince touch an enemy, the game does not shift to a battle scene. Instead, it kicks up a dust cloud as the battle ensues out of sight. As a further separation from the RPG genre, the player does not select from a series of menu commands. Instead, the player just watches the battle. This causes a back-and-forth loss of physical strength while the Sablé Prince and the enemy engage each other. If the Sable Prince is significantly stronger than the enemy he faces, the enemy will instantly be defeated, essentially letting you skip that battle. Victory or defeat in a typical battle is gauged by the Sablé Prince's strength and weapon, attack speed, armor and defense, and the opposing enemy stats. If a button is pressed during a fight, the player can choose to use an item or run away. Items do various things in battle. For example, wasabi temporarily stuns enemies and saws deal massive damage to tree enemies. Running away can fail, and it is impossible to run away from certain enemies, usually bosses. For bosses, the player must fill up the Sablé Prince's life bar and have the most powerful items found at certain points before battling each boss in order to win against them. If the Sablé Prince is victorious, he will gain money, hearts or other items. If he loses, he will restart from a "hospital" in the town he last visited, but will retain the money he had when he perished. Upon being revived at the hospital the prince will only have 3 hearts, requiring you to pay for healing or leave the town to seek hearts elsewhere.

Transformations
As the story advances, the Sablé Prince will have the ability to transform  into a frog, then later on, a snake. Frogs, Snakes, and Humans each have their own special abilities- some of which are required to switch to in order to progress through the game.

 Human - The form the Sablé Prince starts with. Human has a greater amount of attack power than the other two forms. If the prince attempts to enter water as a Human, he will either drown or will transform into a Frog (only after drinking Mandola's first potion).  To transform back into this form, the Sablé Prince must eat a Joy Fruit, or die. He is reverted to Human form upon waking at a hospital.
 Frog - After Mandola gives the Sablé Prince the frog potion, the Sablé Prince will be able to transform into a humanoid frog by entering watery areas. This form has the highest jump height. Using this form, the prince can enter water safely as well as talk to real frogs and some soldiers (without fighting them). While in the frog form, if the prince touches an insect-type enemy, he will not engage in a fight - rather, he will "eat" it, regaining a heart. This form cannot fight snakes or other foes than insect-type enemies, and snakes are attracted to it. Prince Richard, the Sablé Prince, Jam and many others can take this form.
 Snake - Through drinking Mandola's second potion, only the Sablé Prince can assume this form. When the Sablé Prince eats a HotSprings Egg, he will transform into a snake. It allows the Sablé Prince to pass through tight holes and talk to real snakes without fighting them. While this form cannot fight, you may bite weak enemies, changing them into blocks. Snake form has the lowest jump height. Also, if the Sablé Prince encounters a frog while in the Snake form, he'll terrify it, making it flee and move off the screen.

Related releases

Virtual Console
 "Kaeru no Tame ni Kane wa Naru" was released in Japan as a downloadable Virtual Console title on the Nintendo 3DS on September 5, 2012. The game's price is set at 400 Yen.

Music
 Two official CD albums given out by Club Nintendo Japan have one song each from Kaeru no Tame ni Kane wa Naru. One album is the Peach - Healing Music album, which has a slow-remixed version of the overworld theme created by the original composer, Kazumi Totaka. The other album is the Luigi - B-Side Music album, which has the original overworld theme.
 The famous song known as Totaka's Song, created by Kazumi Totaka, can be found in this title. To hear it, the player must return to the port town following the third quest in the castle, then go left, up, and into the shop next to the boat, and wait for three minutes and 30 seconds.
 A remixed version of the main theme appears as an unlockable record in the Japanese version of WarioWare D.I.Y.

Other appearances in media
 Several characters and things from Kaeru no Tame ni Kane wa Naru, including Prince Richard, make cameo appearances in the Game Boy title The Legend of Zelda: Link's Awakening.
 Mad Scienstein (Dr. Knit Witt in the fan translation), the "Nantendo" employee from Kaeru no Tame ni Kane wa Naru appears in Wario Land 3, Dr. Mario 64 as a playable character and opponent, as well as Wario Land 4 as a fellow explorer in the bonus rooms, and as a projectile.
 It is possible to collect a "Sticker" of the Sablé Prince (Referred to in-game as the Sabure Prince) in the vault section of the Wii title Super Smash Bros. Brawl.
 The main protagonist appears as an Assist Trophy summon character in Super Smash Bros. for Nintendo 3DS and Wii U under the name of Sablé Prince, and in Super Smash Bros. Ultimate under the name Prince of Sablé. Prince Richard and the Frog and Snake forms also make appearances as collectible spirits.

References

External links
 Official Japanese Nintendo website (Translated using Excite.Co.Jp)
 
The Frog For Whom the Bell Tolls at NinDB

1992 video games
Fantasy video games
Game Boy games
Intelligent Systems games
Japan-exclusive video games
Nintendo Switch Online games
Role-playing video games
Video games about amphibians
Video games scored by Kazumi Totaka
Video games developed in Japan
Virtual Console games
Virtual Console games for Nintendo 3DS